Will Clapp (born December 10, 1995) is an American football center for the Los Angeles Chargers of the National Football League (NFL). He played college football at Louisiana State University.

Early years
Clapp attended Brother Martin High School in New Orleans, Louisiana. He committed to play football for the LSU Tigers in January 2010.

College career
Clapp did not play as a true freshman in 2014 and chose to redshirt. In 2015, as a redshirt freshman, Clapp started all 12 games for the Tigers. He ranked third on the team in total snaps with 776 and knockdown blocks with 88, along with not allowing a sack all season. He was named to the 2015 SEC-All Freshman team.

As a redshirt sophomore in 2016, Clapp started 11 of 12 games, missing one due to injury. He played 648 snaps, had 58 knockdown blocks and did not allow a sack for the second straight season. He was named to the 2016 All-SEC football team.

In 2017, Clapp started all 13 games for the Tigers. He was named to the All-SEC Football Team for the second year in a row. After the season, he announced he was going to forgo his final year of eligibility and enter the 2018 NFL Draft.

Professional career

New Orleans Saints
Clapp was drafted by the New Orleans Saints in the seventh round (245th overall) of the 2018 NFL Draft. On May 10, 2018, Clapp signed his rookie contract with the Saints. He made his NFL debut on December 17, 2018 against the Carolina Panthers as a substitute for Michael Ola.

On September 26, 2020, Clapp was waived by the Saints and re-signed to the practice squad on September 29. He was promoted to the active roster on October 3. He was waived on October 8 and re-signed to the practice squad two days later. He was elevated to the active roster on October 24, October 31, November 28, and December 5 for the team's weeks 7, 8, 12, and 13 games against the Carolina Panthers, Chicago Bears, Denver Broncos, and Atlanta Falcons, and reverted to the practice squad after each game. On December 19, 2020, Clapp was promoted to the active roster. He was placed on the reserve/COVID-19 list by the team on January 16, 2021, and activated on February 4.

Clapp re-signed with the Saints on April 20, 2021. He was placed on injured reserve on September 6, 2021. He was activated on October 2. He was waived on October 25, and re-signed to the practice squad. He was promoted to the active roster on November 25. He was waived on December 13 and re-signed to the practice squad.

Los Angeles Chargers
On April 26, 2022, Clapp signed with the Los Angeles Chargers.

References

External links
LSU Tigers bio
Twitter

1995 births
Living people
Players of American football from New Orleans
American football centers
Los Angeles Chargers players
LSU Tigers football players
New Orleans Saints players